is a psychological horror adventure game that was made with RPG Tsukūru 95 by Nishida Yoshitaka (西田好孝). The game was highly acclaimed in the Fourth ASCII Entertainment Software Contest, awarded a Grand Prix of 10,000,000 yen, which resulted in remaking the game for PlayStation by Enterbrain. That version, entitled Forget me not -Palette-, saw the release on April 26, 2001 exclusively in Japan.

Gameplay
In Palette, the player helps a girl, referred to as B.D., who apparently turned amnesiac by an accident, restore her memory as a well-known psychiatrist, Dr. Shian. The player essentially controls B.D. in her memory, which constitutes a maze with rooms and passages. In exploration, there are two modes of gameplay; in one mode, maps are colored in black and white often sprinkled with bright red, that denotes for example blood, with a noise continuously ringing, in which players can go between maps. With B.D. moving to another map, the gauge shown on the right side of the screen decreases one by one, it occurs also when B.D. touches barriers that are placed occasionally in maps. When the said gauge reached the bottom line, B.D. claims headache, and players would be sent back to the map of Shian's office. Shian would call her again to continue the game.

When B.D. examines a specific object in the said mode, the game switches to the other mode. In that mode, in which maps are tinted with sepia-toned colors, while not allowed to change scenes, the player can restore B.D.'s "missing" memories by examining objects framed in a white line. When a specific thing is checked, a range of exploration would be expanded with a new passage lifted. If the player checks on the object that switched the gameplay mode once again, the gameplay mode would be changed back to the one mentioned before.

Continuing the game, the player would discover a "piece of memory", which not only increases scales of the said gauge by one, but also might be a clue to find her further memory. When all of B.D.'s memories are lifted, the game would be accomplished.

Plot

The story begins when Shianosu B. Shian (シアノス・B・シアン) writes about memory for the Central News newspaper in his office. At midnight, when he decides to leave his office, he is visited by a woman. He first declines her, yet when he is threatened with a gun, he reluctantly agrees and answers a phone call from the amnesiac girl, B.D.

References

Adventure games
RPG Maker games
Video games developed in Japan
Windows-only freeware games
Windows games